KDVL (102.5 FM, "Cruiser 102") is an American commercial radio station licensed to serve Devils Lake, North Dakota.  The station is owned by Double Z Broadcasting, Inc., and operated along with its three sister stations under the collective name Lake Region Radio Works. KDVL airs a classic hits music format, which covers mainly 1970s and 1980s, and some hits from the late 1960s.

The station was assigned the KDVL call letters by the Federal Communications Commission on June 19, 1978.

References

External links

DVL
Classic hits radio stations in the United States
Ramsey County, North Dakota
Radio stations established in 1967